Aleana Egan (born 1979) is an Irish sculptor.

Career
Egan was born in Dublin in 1979. Having attended Senior College, Dún Laoghaire–Rathdown she went on to graduate with a BA (Hons) in Fine Art and Painting from Glasgow School of Art in 2003.   Egan was based in Dublin.

Works/Exhibitions
 'Shapes from Life' – 2015 – Douglas Hyde Gallery, Trinity College, Dublin
 Piece for "two birds/one stone" – 2016 – Farmleigh Gallery, Dublin
 2017 – Konrad Fischer Galerie, Berlin, Germany
 'Pearl Blauvelt/Aleana Egan' – 2018 – Mary, Mary, Glasgow, United Kingdom
 'Bronze Loops' – 2018 – Kerlin Gallery, Dublin
 2018 Merrion Square Park, Dublin

References

1979 births
Living people
21st-century Irish women artists
Alumni of the Glasgow School of Art
Irish women sculptors
Date of birth missing (living people)
People from Dún Laoghaire–Rathdown
Artists from Dublin (city)